Apulum was a fort in the Roman province of Dacia in the 2nd and 4th centuries AD, located in today's Alba-Iulia, Romania. It is the largest castrum located in Romania, occupying 37.5 hectares (93 acres) (750 x 500 m2).

The types of coins discovered

See also 
 List of castra
 Apulum (ancient city)
 Apulon

Notes

External links 
 
 Apulum Archaeology
 Roman castra from Romania – Google Maps / Earth

Alba Iulia
Roman legionary fortresses in Romania
Ancient history of Transylvania
Historic monuments in Alba County